Ana Isabel Elias (born 17 September 1965) is an Angolan middle-distance runner. She competed in the women's 1500 metres at the 1992 Summer Olympics.

References

External links
 

1965 births
Living people
Athletes (track and field) at the 1992 Summer Olympics
Angolan female middle-distance runners
Olympic athletes of Angola
Place of birth missing (living people)